Prosciutto crudo, in English often shortened to prosciutto, is Italian uncooked, unsmoked, and dry-cured ham. Prosciutto crudo is usually served thinly sliced.

Several regions in Italy have their own variations of prosciutto crudo, each with degrees of protected status, but the most prized are Prosciutto di Parma DOP from Emilia-Romagna and Prosciutto di San Daniele DOP from Friuli Venezia Giulia. Unlike speck (Speck Alto Adige PGI) from the South Tyrol region, prosciutto is not smoked. There is also a tradition of making prosciutto in southern Switzerland.

In Italian, prosciutto means any kind of ham, either dry-cured (prosciutto crudo or simply crudo) or cooked (prosciutto cotto), but in English-speaking countries, it usually means either Italian prosciutto crudo or similar hams made elsewhere. However, the word "prosciutto" itself is not protected; cooked ham may legally be, and in practice is, sold as prosciutto (usually as prosciutto cotto, and from Italy or made in the Italian style) in English-speaking regions.

Etymology
The word prosciutto derives in turn from Italian asciutto ("dry"), with prefix substitution, or from Vulgar Latin pro (before) + exsuctus (past participle of exsugere "to suck out [the moisture]"); the Portuguese presunto has the same etymology. It is similar to the modern Italian verb prosciugare "to dry thoroughly" (from Latin pro + exsucare "to extract the juices from").

Manufacture

Prosciutto is made from either a pig's or a wild boar's hind leg or thigh, and the base term prosciutto specifically refers to this product. Prosciutto may also be made using the hind leg of other animals, in which case the name of the animal is included in the name of the product, for example, "prosciutto cotto d'agnello" ("lamb prosciutto"). The process of making prosciutto can take from nine months to two years, depending on the size of the ham.

A writer on Italian food, Bill Buford, describes talking to an old Italian butcher who says:

Today, the ham is first cleaned, salted, and left for about two months. During this time, the ham is pressed gradually and carefully to drain all blood left in the meat without breaking the bone. Next, it is washed several times to remove the salt and is hung in a dark, well-ventilated environment. The surrounding air is important to the final quality of the ham; the best results are obtained in a cold climate. The ham is then left until dry. The time this takes varies, depending on the local climate and size of the ham. When the ham is completely dry, it is hung to air, either at room temperature or in a controlled environment, for up to 18 months.

Prosciutto is sometimes cured with nitrites (either sodium or potassium), which are generally used in other hams to produce the desired rosy color and unique flavor, but only sea salt is used in Protected Designation of Origin hams.
Such rosy pigmentation is produced by a direct chemical reaction of nitric oxide with myoglobin to form nitrosomyoglobin, followed by concentration of the pigments due to drying. Bacteria convert the added nitrite or nitrate to nitric oxide.

Use

Sliced prosciutto crudo in Italian cuisine is often served as an antipasto, wrapped around grissini, or accompanied with melon or figs.  It is also eaten as an accompaniment to cooked spring vegetables, such as asparagus or peas. It may be included in a simple pasta sauce made with cream or a Tuscan dish of tagliatelle and vegetables. It is used in stuffings for other meats, such as veal, as a wrap around veal or steak, in a filled bread, or as a pizza topping.

Saltimbocca is an Italian veal dish in which escalopes of veal are topped with a sage leaf before being wrapped in prosciutto and then pan-fried. Prosciutto is often served in sandwiches and panini, sometimes in a variation on the Caprese salad, with basil, tomato and fresh mozzarella.

European Union Protected Designations of Origin

Prosciutto crudo

Under the Common Agricultural Policy of the European Union (EU), certain well-established meat products, including some local prosciutto, are covered by a Protected Designation of Origin (PDO) – DOP in Italian – and other, less stringent designations of geographical origin for traditional specialties. Various regions have their own PDO, whose specifications do not generally require ham from free-range pigs. The simple Italian description prosciutto, used alone or with crudo or cotto, is not in itself a protected term.

The two famous types of Italian prosciutto crudo are: prosciutto crudo di Parma, from Parma, and prosciutto crudo di San Daniele, from the San Daniele del Friuli area, in the Friuli-Venezia Giulia region. The prosciutto di Parma has a slightly nutty flavor from the Parmigiano Reggiano whey that is sometimes added to the pigs' diet. The prosciutto di San Daniele is darker, and sweeter in flavor.  For both of them, the product regulations allow salt as the only additive to the meat, prohibiting additives such as nitrite and nitrate that are often used in unprotected products.

European Protected Designations of Origin (PDO) and Geographical indications and traditional specialities (PGI) apply for several prosciutto varieties in Italy, each slightly different in color, flavor, and texture:
 , Parma, PDO 
 , San Daniele del Friuli, PDO 
 , Modena, PDO
 , Tuscany, PDO
 , Veneto, PDO
 , near Carpegna, Montefeltro, PDO
 , near Amatrice, Lazio, PGI 
 , Norcia, PGI
 , Sauris, PGI
 Crudo di Cuneo, Cuneo, PDO
 Valle d'Aosta Jambon de Bosses, Val d'Aosta, PDO

Culatello

 is similar to prosciutto but is made from the filet or loin of the hind leg.  It is aged in a beef or hog's bladder as a casing to prevent spoilage and contamination.  Culatello di Zibello possesses PDO status. It is commonly served as a starter.

Strolghino is a salame prepared from leftover cuts of culatello.

Pršut

In Montenegro, Bosnia and Herzegovina, Slovenia (especially the Karst Plateau and the Vipava Valley), Serbia, and Croatia (Dalmatia, the island of Krk and Istria), pršut is a common form of dry-cured ham. Pršut from Dalmatia, Herzegovina, and Serbia are smoked, unlike the Italian product, while that from Slovenia, Istria, and Krk is not smoked. The mountain village of Njeguši in Montenegro produces the smoked njeguški pršut.

The following types of pršut have a protected status in the European Union and the UK:

See also

 , made in northern Italy from air-dried beef
 , salted lard made in Italy
 , salted lard made in Eastern Europe
 , a dry-cured ham made in China 
 , a method of curing pork originating from the Southern U.S., also widely known as "Virginia ham," cooked either during processing or before eating
 , a dry-cured ham made in France
 , a dry-cured ham made in Spain
  / , a dry-cured ham made in Spain and Portugal
 , dry-cured ham made in Portugal
 , a dry-cured and air-dried ham made traditionally in Bulgaria, Elena region
 
 
 
 , culinary opportunities in Italy's capital and largest city

Notes and references

Further reading
 McGee, Harold. On Food and Cooking (revised). New York, New York: Scribner, 2004.

External links

 Official Website (in English) of Prosciutto di Parma
 Official Website of Prosciutto di San Daniele

Dried meat
Ham
Italian products with protected designation of origin
Italian cuisine
Albanian cuisine
Croatian cuisine
Montenegrin cuisine
Salumi
Slovenian cuisine
Smoked meat

pl:Szynka parmeńska